Shaw Kgathi is a Botswana politician. In 2009 he was elected as the Minister of Youth, Sport  and Culture. He is a member of Parliament of Botswana and represents Bobirwa.

He had previously held sports positions, including sports master at junior and senior schools and was also a Director in the Department of Sports and Recreation and Supreme Council for Sports.

References

1961 births
Living people
Members of the National Assembly (Botswana)
Government ministers of Botswana
Defence ministers of Botswana
People from Central District (Botswana)